Emmalocera minoralis is a species of snout moth in the genus Emmalocera. It is found in Australia (Queensland).

References

Moths described in 1903
Emmalocera